Hubert Digby Watson  (31 December 1869 – 9 October 1947) was an English first-class cricketer and colonial administrator.

The son of Arthur George Watson, he was born at Harrow in December 1869. He was educated at Harrow School, before going up to Balliol College, Oxford. While studying at Oxford, he made ten appearances in first-class cricket for Oxford University in 1891–92. He scored 248 runs in his ten matches, at an average of 13.05 and with a high score of 40.

After graduating from Oxford, Watson joined the Indian Civil Service in December 1893, where he was posted to the Punjab as an assistant commissioner. He was a political officer at Wanna in 1898, before being transferred to the North-West Frontier Province in 1901, with Watson serving there as a deputy commissioner by 1904. He was made a Companion to the Order of the Indian Empire in the 1919 New Year Honours. Watson later served as a treasurer for Save the Children and was appointed a Commander of the Order of the British Empire in the 1932 New Year Honours. Watson died in October 1947 at Inkpen, Berkshire. His brother, Arthur, and uncles, Reginald and Kenelm, all played first-class cricket.

References

External links

1869 births
1947 deaths
People from Harrow, London
People educated at Harrow School
Alumni of Balliol College, Oxford
English cricketers
Oxford University cricketers
Indian Civil Service (British India) officers
Companions of the Order of the Indian Empire
Commanders of the Order of the British Empire